Alessandro Sibilio (born 27 April 1999) is an Italian 400 metres hurdles and 400 metres dash, who won a gold medal at the 2018 IAAF World U20 Championships. He competed at the 2020 Summer Olympics, in 400 m hurdles.

Personal bests
400 metres: 45.08 ( Nocera Inferiore, 18 June 2022)
400 metres hurdles: 47.93 ( Tokyo, 1 August 2021)

Progression

400 m hs

Achievements

National titles
Sibilio won two national championships at individual senior level.

Italian Athletics Championships
400 m hs: 2019, 2021 (2)

See also
 List of Italian records in athletics
 Italy at the 2019 IAAF World Relays
 List of European junior records in athletics
 Italian all-time lists - 400 metres hurdles

References

External links

1999 births
Living people
Italian male sprinters
Italian male hurdlers
Athletics competitors of Fiamme Gialle
Italian Athletics Championships winners
Athletes (track and field) at the 2020 Summer Olympics
Athletes from Naples
Olympic athletes of Italy
21st-century Italian people